Global International Airways (also known as GIA) was an American charter airline company based in Kansas City, Missouri.

History
Global International began seasonal flights to Amsterdam, Frankfurt, London and Paris using the Boeing 707 in 1981. Global also used Boeing 727s for charters to the Caribbean as well as a leased Boeing 747-100. It was financed by a number of unsecured loans totaling $600,000 from the Indian Springs State Bank, at the instigation of Farhad Azima. Global International filed for bankruptcy in 1983, its bad loans being a major factor in the closing of Indian Springs a year later in 1984.

Fleet

Global International operated the following aircraft:

Accidents and incidents
On December 4, 1982, a Boeing 707-320B (registered N8434) struck an ISL aerial during takeoff at Brasília International Airport on its way to New York City. The aircraft returned and made an emergency landing where its left landing gear collapsed. All 49 passengers and 8 crew members survived without injuries.

See also

List of defunct airlines of the United States
Mark Lombardi

References

Airlines established in 1978
Airlines disestablished in 1984
Defunct airlines of the United States
Companies based in Kansas City, Missouri